Luco de Jiloca is a village in Calamocha, Teruel, Spain.

Populated places in the Province of Teruel